Malcolm Milward (born 22 August 1948) is a former English cricketer.  Milward was a right-handed batsman who bowled right-arm medium pace.  He was born in Stoke-on-Trent, Staffordshire.

Milward made a single appearance for Staffordshire in the 1976 Minor Counties Championship against Lincolnshire.  In Staffordshires' first-innings, he was dismissed for a duck by Somachandra de Silva, while in their second-innings he ended unbeaten on 2.  With the ball, he took the wicket of Michael Hodson in Lincolnshires' first-innings for the cost of 9 runs from 4 overs, while he didn't bowl in their second-innings.  He next played for Staffordshire in 1978, making his only List A appearance against Devon in the Gillette Cup.  In this match, he didn't bat and bowled 12 wicket-less overs.

References

External links
Malcolm Milward at ESPNcricinfo
Malcolm Milward at CricketArchive

1948 births
Living people
Cricketers from Stoke-on-Trent
English cricketers
Staffordshire cricketers